Benhar may refer to :

Benhar, Algeria, a town and commune in Djelfa Province, Algeria
Benhar, New Zealand, a settlement in Otago Region, New Zealand.